Zuleikha Ismail kyzy Huseynova (1924-1996) was a Soviet-Azerbaijani Politician (Communist).

She served as Minister of Education in 1965.

References

1924 births
1996 deaths
20th-century Azerbaijani women politicians
20th-century Azerbaijani politicians
Soviet women in politics
Azerbaijani communists
Women government ministers of Azerbaijan